HSR or University of Applied Sciences Rapperswil is a technical university in Rapperswil, a locality of the city of Rapperswil-Jona, Switzerland. HSR is part of the University of Applied Sciences of Eastern Switzerland.

Location
The university is located in Rapperswil nearby Seedamm respectively Rapperswil railway station and Knie's Kinderzoo on upper Lake Zürich (Obersee).

Trivia
Archaeological relicts have been found at the Technikum island settlement, and the remains of a first wooden bridge (1523 BC, reconstructed in 2001) to Hurden located on the Obersee lakeshore nearby the Technical University (HSR) respectively the so-called Heilig Hüsli at the northwestern part of the Seedamm area. The three neighbouring Prehistoric settlements, as well as the early lake crossings, are part of the UNESCO World Heritage Site Prehistoric Pile dwellings around the Alps.

See also
List of largest universities by enrollment in Switzerland
List of universities in Switzerland

References

External links

 www.hsr.ch
 www.fho.ch
 www.gis.hsr.ch

Universities of Applied Sciences in Switzerland
Canton of Zürich
Canton of Glarus
Canton of Schwyz
Buildings and structures in Rapperswil-Jona